Johann Georg Turmair (or Thurmayr) (4 July 1477 – 9 January 1534), known by the pen name Johannes Aventinus (Latin for "John of Abensberg") or Aventin, was a Bavarian Renaissance humanist historian and philologist. He authored the 1523 Annals of Bavaria, a valuable record of the early history of Germany.

Tutor
Having studied at Ingolstadt, Vienna, Cracow and Paris, he returned to Ingolstadt in 1507 and in 1509 was appointed tutor to Louis and Ernest, the two younger brothers of William IV, Duke of Bavaria, all three the sons of Albert the Wise, the late duke of Bavaria. Aventinus retained this position until 1517, wrote a Latin grammar (Rudimenta grammaticae latinae; 1512) and other manuals for the use of his pupils, and in 1515 travelled in Italy with Ernest.  In his zeal for learning, he helped found the Sodalitas litteraria Angilostadensis, the "literary brotherhood of Ingolstadt", under the auspices of which several old manuscripts were brought to light; however, it soon ceased to exist (1520).

Historian of Bavaria
In 1517, William appointed him as Bavaria's official historian and commissioned him to write a history of the country.  Many of the important authorities which Aventinus collected for this purpose have been preserved only in his copies. He embodied a critical treatment of them in a complete history of Bavaria, Annales Bojorum ("Annals of Bavaria"). His condensed German version of it, the Bayerische Chronik, is the first important history in the German language.

The Reformation
Aventinus remained a Catholic throughout his life, even though he sympathized with aspects of the Protestant reform. He was in communication with Philipp Melanchthon and Martin Luther. He rejected auricular confession, objected to pilgrimages and indulgences, and opposed the claims of the hierarchy as excessive. He showed a strong dislike for monks. On this account, he was imprisoned in 1528, but his friends soon effected his release. The remainder of his life was somewhat unsettled, and he died at Regensburg.

Annals of Bavaria
The Annals, which are in seven volumes, deal with the history of Bavaria in conjunction with general history from the earliest times to 1460, and the author shows sympathy for the Empire in its struggle with the Papacy. He took pains with his work, and to some degree anticipated the modern historiography. Another result of his nonconformity was that the Annals were not published until 1554. Many passages were omitted in this Ingolstadt edition, as they reflected on the Roman Catholics.

A more complete edition was published at Basel in 1580 by Nicholas Cisner. Aventinus, who has been called the "Bavarian Herodotus," wrote other books of lesser importance, and a complete edition of his works was published at Munich (1881–1886).

In his Annals, Aventinus preserved some of the text of the now lost 8th-century chronicle of Creontius.

Teutonic genealogy
In his Chronik, Aventinus  fabricated a  succession of Teutonic kings stretching back to the Great Flood, ruling over vast swathes of Germany and surrounding regions until the 1st century BC, and involving themselves in numerous events from Biblical and  Classical history.

These rulers and their exploits are mostly fictitious, though some are derived from mythological, legendary or historical figures. Examples of the latter are Boiger, Kels II and Teutenbuecher, whose joint reign is given as 127–100 BC, and who are based on King Boiorix of the Cimbri, the unnamed king of the Ambrones, and King Teutobod of the Teutons.

Legacy 
Ludwig I of Bavaria had Aventinus' bust erected in the Walhalla temple.
There is a German wheat beer named after him, made by G. Schneider & Son.

Notes

External links
 
 Online Galleries, History of Science Collections, University of Oklahoma Libraries  High resolution images of works by and/or portraits of Johannes Aventinus in .jpg and .tiff format.

Further reading
 
 
 Eberhard Dünninger: Johannes Aventinus: Leben und Werk des Bayerischen Geschichtschreibers, Förg, Rosenheim 1977, 
 Bayerische Landesbibliothek Online (BLO): Aventinus: Works: https://www.bayerische-landesbibliothek-online.de/aventinus-works

1477 births
1534 deaths
16th-century Latin-language writers
16th-century German historians
German Renaissance humanists
People from the Duchy of Bavaria
Academic staff of the University of Ingolstadt
German male non-fiction writers